Albert Brehme (born 29 June 1903; date of death unknown) was a German bobsledder who competed in the 1930s. He won two bronze medals at the FIBT World Championships (Two-man: 1933, Four-man: 1930).

Brehme was seriously injured, along with teammates Fritz Grau and Helmut Hopnaann, shortly before the 1932 Winter Olympics. He also finished sixth in the two-man event at the 1936 Winter Olympics in Garmisch-Partenkirchen.

References
Bobsleigh two-man world championship medalists since 1931
Bobsleigh four-man world championship medalists since 1930
Wallechinsky, David. (1984). "Bobsled: Two-man". In The Complete Book of the Olympics: 1896-1980. New York: Penguin Books. p. 558.
Albert Brehme Seriously Hurt in Sled Crash

1903 births
German male bobsledders
Olympic bobsledders of Germany
Bobsledders at the 1936 Winter Olympics
Year of death missing